The Admiral Pereira da Silva class of frigates, also known as Admiral-class frigates, were in the service of the Portuguese Navy between 1966 and 1985. The three ships of the class were built in Portugal, at the Lisnave shipyards and the shipyards of Viana do Castelo. The construction of the ships was part of the effort of Portugal to expand its fleet in the face of unrest in the empire and was financed by the United States via the Mutual Defense Assistance Program. Financial problems prevented them from ever being modernised and they were deleted in 1989.

Design and description
By the 1960s, Portugal retained an extensive empire and the vast majority of the Portuguese Navy's warships were dedicated to patrolling its waters. However, in that decade the empire saw unrest and invasion and the navy was expanded to meet those threats. Three ships were ordered from Portuguese shipyards to a modified design of the American s. They were funded in the United States as hulls DE-1039, DE-1042 and DE-1046 under the Mutual Defense Assistance Program. The vessels were modified for service in tropical climates for service within the empire. They had a complement of 166 including 12 officers.

The Admiral Pereira da Silva-class ships were propelled by a propeller on a single shaft turned by a De Laval geared turbine creating .

The vessels were primarily designed for anti-submarine warfare (ASW). They were armed with two twin-mounted /50-caliber dual-purpose guns, with one turret forward and one aft. In the "B" position forward, the frigates mounted two four-barrelled Bofors  anti-submarine rocket launchers. The Admiral Pereira da Silvas also mounted two depth charge throwers and two triple  Mk 32 ASW torpedo tubes for Mark 44 torpedoes.

Admiral Pereira da Silva-class frigates were equipped with Mark 63 fire-control systems. They were also fitted with MLA-1B search, Type 978 tactical and SPG-34 fire control radars. Th three ships of the class were equipped with different sonar to reduce frequency interference. Admiral Pereira da Silva was given SQS-30, Admiral Gago Coutinho was given SQS-31 and Admiral Magalhães Correia was given SQS-31. All three vessels mounted SQA-10A variable depth sonar and DUBA-38 sonar.

Ships

Construction and career
All three ships were constructed in Portugal. After they entered service, the Portuguese Empire was disassembled beginning in the 1970s and the Portuguese economy suffered as a result. This prevented the ships from ever receiving their planned refits and saw maintenance issues increase over their careers. They were intended to be replaced by Dutch s but Portugal acquired the s instead.

See also 
  - Norwegian ship class based on US Dealey class

Notes

Citations

References

External links

 Dealey-class ocean escorts at Destroyer History Foundation

 

Frigate classes
Ships built in Portugal